The Shillong Premier League (currently known as Officer's Choice Blue Shillong Premier League for sponsorship reasons) is a top state-level football league in Indian state of Meghalaya, organised by the Shillong Sports Association (SSA), which is affiliated to the Meghalaya Football Association (MFA). It was started with 8 teams in 2010. Mawlai SC are the current champions.

Competition structure

Teams

Current teams

Previous teams

Winners

See also
Meghalaya Football Association

References

Shillong Premier League
Football in Meghalaya
Football leagues in India
2010 establishments in Meghalaya
Sports leagues established in 2010
Shillong